In linguistics, conversion, also called zero derivation or null derivation, is a kind of word formation involving the creation of a word (of a new word class) from an existing word (of a different word class) without any change in form, which is to say, derivation using only zero. For example, the noun green in golf (referring to a putting-green) is derived ultimately from the adjective green.

Conversions from adjectives to nouns and vice versa are both very common and unnotable in English; much more remarked upon is the creation of a verb by converting a noun or other word (e.g., the adjective clean becomes the verb to clean).

Verbification  
Verbification, or verbing, is the creation of a verb from a noun, adjective or other word.

In English

In English, verbification typically involves simple conversion of a non-verb to a verb. The verbs to verbify and to verb, the first by derivation with an affix and the second by zero derivation, are themselves products of verbification (see autological word), and, as might be guessed, the term to verb is often used more specifically, to refer only to verbification that does not involve a change in form. (Verbing in this specific sense is therefore a kind of anthimeria.)

Examples of verbification in the English language number in the thousands, including some of the most common words such as mail and e-mail, strike, talk, salt, pepper, switch, bed, sleep, ship, train, stop, drink, cup, lure, mutter, dress, dizzy, divorce, fool, merge, to be found on virtually every page in the dictionary. Thus, verbification is by no means confined to slang and has furnished English with countless new expressions: "access", as in "access the file", which was previously only a noun, as in "gain access to the file". Similar mainstream examples include "host", as in "host a party", and "chair", as in "chair the meeting". Other formations, such as "gift", are less widespread but nevertheless mainstream.

Verbification may have a bad reputation with some English users because it is such a potent source of neologisms. Although some neologistic products of verbification may meet considerable opposition from prescriptivist authorities (the verb sense of impact is a well-known example), most such derivations have become so central to the language after several centuries of use that they no longer draw notice.

In many cases, the verbs were distinct from their noun counterparts in Old English, and regular sound change has made them the same form: these can be reanalysed as conversion. "Don't talk the talk if you can't walk the walk" is an example of a sentence using those forms.

In other languages
In other languages, verbification is a more regular process. However, such processes often do not qualify as conversion, as they involve changes in the form of the word. For example, in Esperanto, any word can be transformed into a verb, either by altering its ending to -i, or by applying suffixes such as -igi and -iĝi; and in Semitic languages, the process often involves changes of internal vowels, such as the Hebrew word "גגל", from the proper noun גוגל.
In Toki Pona, any content word may function as a noun, verb or adjective depending on syntax. For example, moku  may either mean food or to eat.

Noun conversion in English

Many English nouns are formed from unmodified verbs: a fisherman's catch, to go for a walk, etc.

Humor
Verbification is sometimes used to create nonce words or joking words. Often, simple conversion is involved, as with formations like beer, as in beer me ("give me a beer") and eye, as in eye it ("look at it"). Sometimes, a verbified form can occur with a prepositional particle, e.g., sex as in sex it up ("make it sexier").

A Calvin and Hobbes strip dealt with this phenomenon, concluding with the statement that "Verbing weirds language", demonstrating the verbing of both verb and weird. (The former appears in its use as a gerund.)

References

External links

 "Grammar Puss" by Steven Pinker
 Figures of Speech
 "Verbing Nouns"

Word coinage
Linguistic morphology

br:Verbadurezh